The buccal object/SLOB rule is a method used to determine the relative position of two objects in the oral cavity using projectional dental radiography.

Clark's Rule
In 1909, Clark described a radiographic procedure for localizing impacted teeth to determining their relative antero-posterior position.  If the two teeth (or, by extension, any two objects, such as a tooth and a foreign object) are located in front of one another relative to the x-ray beam, they will appear superimposed on one another on a dental radiograph, but it will be impossible to know which one is in front of the other.  To determine which is in front and which is behind, Clark proposed his SLOB rule, as a complicated set of three radiographs, but which can be simplified as follows using just two:

Expose another film while angle of the x-ray beam has been changed.  If an object moves in the same direction as the source of the x-ray beam, it is lingual to the other object.  If the object moves in the opposite direction of the source, it is buccal to the other object.

Same Lingual; Opposite Buccal

SLOB rule in Dentistry Video Tutorial

The video below shows a 5 minute illustration describing SLOB rule in dentistry

https://www.youtube.com/embed/AzjvFPlZtZg

Buccal Object Rule

In 1952, Richards amended this rule using only 2 radiographs, asserting that the object positioned more buccally will move more relative to the object positioned more palatally or lingually.

As a generalization, but not specifically stated as part of Richards' buccal object rule, the more buccal an object is (i.e. the closer it is to the x-ray source) the more it will move in the second radiograph when repositioning the x-ray source.

At the University of Alabama School of Dentistry, this rule is referred to as the BAMA rule: buccal always moves away.

References

Dentistry